The Chivela Pass is a narrow mountain pass in the Sierra Madre Mountains that funnels cooler, drier air from the North American continent, through southern Mexico, into the Pacific. These northeasterly winds, specifically the Tehuano wind, which periodically blows across the Isthmus of Tehuantepec in southern Mexico, and offshore over hundreds of miles of the Pacific Ocean, forcing the upwelling of colder subsurface waters.  This strong upwelling brings nutrients from the subsurface layers of the ocean, thereby enhancing the fertility of the offshore waters.  This results in strong plankton growth which in turn supports a more bountiful fishery in the region.

In extreme circumstances during the winter, truly cold, dense, air occasionally flows from the Bay of Campeche in the Gulf of Mexico through the Chivela Pass into the Gulf of Tehuantepec on the Pacific side. These winds can be strong enough to sandblast paint off ships in near-coastal waters.

Notes

External links
The Gulf of Tehuantepec Hurricane Force Wind Event of 30-31 March 2003
The Structure and Evolution of Gap Outflow over the Gulf of Tehuantepec, Mexico

Atmospheric dynamics
Mountain passes of Mexico
Landforms of Oaxaca
Rail mountain passes of Mexico